Sironko District is a district in the Eastern Region of Uganda. The district was created in 2000 and had previously been part of Mbale District. Sironko is the main commercial town in the district.

Location
Sironko District is bordered by Bulambuli District to the north, Kapchorwa and Kween Districts to the north-east, Kenya to the east, Bududa District to the south-east, Mbale District to south-west, and Bukedea District to the west.

Population
In 1991, the national population census estimated the district population at 147,700. The national census in 2002 estimated the population at 185,800, with an annual growth rate of 2.6 percent. The population in 2012 was estimated to be 239,600.

Geography

Major towns
Sironko is the largest town and the administrative headquarters. Mafuni, Nakaloke, Mutufu, and Budadiri are the main trading centers within the district.

Counties, sub-counties and constituencies
Budadiri County is the only county in the district.

Economy 
The primary activity is agriculture with a focus on food crops such as beans, groundnuts, sorghum, millet, cassava, potatoes and sweet potatoes. Coffee and cotton are the main cash crops. Fruits and vegetables grown in the district include passion fruit, tomatoes, onions and cabbage.

Tourist attractions 
Part of Mount Elgon National Park lies within Sironko district. One of the two main trails in the park, Sasa trail, starts near the Budadiri trading center located within the district.

References

External links 
Sironko District Has High Percentage of Senior Citizens

 
Districts of Uganda
Bugisu sub-region
Eastern Region, Uganda
2000 establishments in Uganda